is a railway station in Tsu, Mie Prefecture, Japan, operated by Ise Railway. The station is 19.4 rail kilometers from the terminus of the line at Kawarada Station.

History
Higashi-Ishinden Station opened on September 1, 1973 as a station on the Japan National Railways (JNR) Ise Line. The Ise Line was privatized on March 27, 1987, four days before the dissolution of the JNR on April 1, 1987.

Lines
Ise Railway
Ise Line

Station layout
Higashi-Ishinden Station consists of a single elevated side platform serving bi-directional traffic. The station is unattended.

Platforms

Adjacent stations 

|-
!colspan=5|Ise Railway

External links

 Official home page 

Railway stations in Japan opened in 1973
Railway stations in Mie Prefecture